The Dancing Floor is a 1926 novel by John Buchan featuring Edward Leithen. It is the third of five novels written about the character of Leithen.

Basic Plot Summary 
Edward Leithen is an eminent lawyer who is introduced to the young and handsome Vernon Milburne. By chance, Leithen meets Milburne once again and they become close friends. Milburne divulges that since childhood he has had a recurring dream in which an impending and unknown threat approaches year by year. The year in which the threat is due to occur, the two friends find themselves on the Greek island of Plakos where they must save the beautiful Koré Arabin from the superstitious islanders.

Mary Butts in a 1933 essay described The Dancing Floor as "one of the first novels to owe its origin to The Golden Bough".

Characters 
Sir Edward Leithen - a lawyer and Tory MP
Vernon Milburne - a tall, handsome young man who first appears as aloof and detached
Koré Arabin - a stubborn and yet vulnerable daughter of a malicious miscreant

References

External links
 

1926 British novels
Novels by John Buchan
Hodder & Stoughton books
Novels set in Greece